Daisuke Suzuki may refer to:

, Japanese footballer
, Japanese musician
, Japanese actor and voice actor
, Japanese shogi player